Here Come the Horns is the second studio album by the American hip hop group Delinquent Habits.

Music videos were made for "This is LA" (video) and "Here Come the Horns" (video).

Critical reception
The Calgary Herald wrote that Delinquent Habits "combine graphic, street-wise raps with hooks galore, with horns a la Herb Alpert and lyrics borrowed from the likes of Grandmaster Flash and Paul McCartney." The Independent deemed the album "spaghetti western soundtrack meets west coast hip hop." The Village Voice concluded that the album "fleshes out their new, politically conscious, mariachi mobster aesthetic ... [the] single of the same name moves away from Dre-influenced funk tracks and toward Latin horns and anti-Prop 187 text."

Track listing

Samples
"Think Your Bad" contains a sample from "The Coolest" by King Tee
"Here Come The Horns" contains a sample from "Bass" by King Tee
"Western Ways" contains a sample from "Smooth Operator" by Sade
"Life Is A Struggle" contains a sample from "For Carlos" by Herb Alpert & The Tijuana Brass

Personnel 
Dorian "Doe" Johnson - mixing
Ivan S. Martin – main artist, executive producer, vocals
Alex Martinez – main artist, executive producer, producer, mixing
Senen Reyes - executive producer, featured artist
Paul Stewart - executive producer
David L.K. Thomas – main artist, executive producer, vocals

References

1998 albums
Delinquent Habits albums
RCA Records albums